P. C. Thomas (26 February 1938 – 27 May 2009) in full Pannivelil Chacko Thomas, was an Indian politician and an MLA in the Kerala Legislative Assembly. He represented Kaduthuruthy constituency in Kottayam district, Kerala.

Life
He was the son of Chacko and Mariamma Pannivelil Eravimangalam. He was survived by his wife, Ancy, their two sons and a daughter.

Career
He worked as a teacher and was headmaster at St. Michaels High School, Kaduthuruthy. He was elected to the 7th and 8th Kerala Legislature.

Thomas was the chairman of the Committee on Petitions (1987–89), president of the Kaduthuruthy Panchayat, and chairman of the Block Development Committee in Kaduthuruthy.

References

1938 births
2009 deaths
Malayali politicians
People from Kottayam district
Kerala MLAs 1982–1987
Kerala MLAs 1987–1991